Potoče is a village in the Vipava Valley in the Municipality of Ajdovščina in the Littoral region of Slovenia.

References

External links 

Potoče at Geopedia

Populated places in the Municipality of Ajdovščina